Sonia Vachon (born March 14, 1966 in Magog, Quebec) is a Canadian actress. She is most noted for her performance in the film 5150 Elm's Way (5150, rue des ormes), for which she was both a Genie Award nominee for Best Supporting Actress at the 30th Genie Awards and a Jutra Award nominee for Best Supporting Actress at the 12th Jutra Awards.

She was also a Jutra nominee in the same category at the 1st Jutra Awards in 1999 for It's Your Turn, Laura Cadieux (C't'à ton tour, Laura Cadieux), and at the 14th Jutra Awards in 2012 for A Sense of Humour (Le Sens de l'humour).2023 Big Brother Célébrités

References

External links

1966 births
20th-century Canadian actresses
21st-century Canadian actresses
Canadian film actresses
Canadian television actresses
Actresses from Quebec
French Quebecers
People from Magog, Quebec
Living people